KCSK-LP (102.3 FM) is a radio station licensed to Hanamaulu, Hawaii, United States.  The station is currently owned by Kauai Christian Assembly.

History
The station was assigned the call letters KCSK-LP on March 19, 2004. On April 3, 2007, the station changed its call sign to DKCSK-LP, on May 2, 2007, to the current KCSK.

The station went silent on September 22, 2018.

References

External links
 

CSK-LP
CSK-LP
2004 establishments in Hawaii